Robert James Phibbs (May 26, 1927 – March 15, 2018) was a Canadian basketball player who competed in the 1952 Summer Olympics. He was born in Windsor, Ontario. He was part of the Canadian basketball team, which was eliminated after the group stage in the 1952 tournament. He played all six matches. Phibbs was on the University of Western Ontario basketball team.

References

External links
Bob Phibbs' obituary

1927 births
2018 deaths
Basketball players at the 1952 Summer Olympics
Canadian men's basketball players
Olympic basketball players of Canada
Basketball players from Windsor, Ontario
Western Mustangs basketball players